El Clásico Tapatío is a Guadalajara, Jalisco-based sporting rivalry between C.D. Guadalajara and Atlas. It is considered the oldest clásico of Mexican football since it dates back to the year 1916.

History
The rivalry was born shortly after the founding of Atlas in August 1916 (Chivas de guadalajara was founded in May 1906, along with the two clubs being from the same city, there was also a difference of social class between the two teams. While Guadalajara were followed by the middle class of the city. Atlas represented and was the favorite of the upper class, due to the fact that the founders of the club came from wealthy families and learned the sport of soccer in their travel as students to the United Kingdom.

The first encounter between the two clubs came in a friendly shortly after Atlas was founded, the end result was a 0–0 draw. The first tournament match came in the "Torneo de Primavera"(Tournament of Spring) of 1917, where Atlas was victorious over Chivas by a score of 2–1 despite complaints of bad referee performance by Chivas. Chivas were so angered by the result, that they refused to play in the next Liga Amateur de Jalisco tournament of 1917–18, unless the president of refereeing, Justo García Godoy, resigned from his position; when Godoy failed to do so Chivas refused to join the tournament. After the tournament was over, Atlas had won their first amateur league and the leader of the collegiate had resigned, Chivas challenged Atlas to a series of 3 matches. Each of the teams won one of the first two matches, both only by a single goal, and the third was won by Atlas; this time there were more complaints because Atlas had used 7 substitutions from the no longer existent Club Colón.

There is a legend that ensures that the first match was favorable to the Atlas by a score of 18–0, although the first reference is a note for a newspaper in Guadalajara published about 50 years after the alleged occurrence of the match. Currently there is no data to confirm the confrontation. Some believe that this match never took place and others that it was only a match without official status between followers of the club.

In 1955 the most curious of the Classical Tapatio happened. The goalkeeper of the Guadalajara, Jaime "Tubo" Gómez, was insulted during a large part of the meeting by the fans. After seeing that the match would be won by Chivas easily after leading 5–0, "Tubo" requested a magazine from someone outside the field, then he sat next to one of the goalposts and began to read it in clear mockery of Atlas faithful.

Atlas and Guadalajara have faced two times in playoffs, both in the quarter-finals. On the first occasion, in the summer tournament 2000,Chivas moved on to the semi-finals to tie both encounters 1–1, since the Guadalajara had better position in the general table. Three and a half years later, in the Opening Tournament 2004,Atlas collected revenge and eliminated their hated rivals by global marker of 4–3. In both games the Guadalajara failed a winning penalty kick. Neither of the teams would move past the semi-finals on either occasion, Chivas were defeated by Toluca and Atlas were defeated by Pumas.

Official matches

Liga Amateur de Jalisco

Copa México

Campeon de Campeones

Primera División 
1. No game; Due to Atlas being in Second Division.
2. No game.

Playoffs 

1. Guadalajara advanced due to better overall position in the league table.

Statistics 
As of 13 August 2022

P. Number of matches played .
WA. Wins for Atlas.
WG. Wins for Guadalajara.
D. Draws.
GoalA. Goals for Atlas.
GoalG. Goals for Guadalajara. 1. In total there were 44 games where the result is unknown.

References

Football rivalries in Mexico
C.D. Guadalajara
Atlas F.C.